Incline Creek is a  southward-flowing stream originating in the Carson Range, Sierra Nevada in the northeast Lake Tahoe Basin in Washoe County in western Nevada. Incline Creek flows through the Diamond Peak Ski Area on the way to Incline Village where it empties into Lake Tahoe.

History
Incline Creek, like Incline Village, is named for the inclined railroad built by H. Sam Marlette and Walter Scott Hobart. This railroad hauled the cut lumber from their lumber mill on Mill Creek, and Lake Tahoe, Tahoe. The Incline Railroad dated back to 1875, and carried the lumber up to a wooden flume that floated the lumber east, down the flume, for transport on the V+T Railroad. The cut lumber was used in Virginia City and Carson City mines, and for home and commercial construction.

Watershed and course
Incline Creek is part of the Lake Tahoe/Truckee River watershed. Like Third Creek, it deposits heavy sediment loads into Lake Tahoe.

Recreation
The Folsom Camp Loop is a relatively easy  trail that begins at Diamond Peak Resort and ascends along Incline Creek to historic Folsom Camp before returning on the other side of the creek. The historic camp is named for lumberman Gilman Folsom, who with Sam Marlette, employed 400 Chinese laborers cutting timber for use in Virginia City.

See also
 List of Lake Tahoe inflow streams

References

Rivers of Nevada
Rivers of Washoe County, Nevada
Lake Tahoe